EmArcy Records is a jazz record label founded in 1954 by the American Mercury Records. The name is a phonetic spelling of "MRC", the initials for Mercury Record Company.

During the 1950s and 1960s, musicians such as Max Roach, Clifford Brown, Cannonball Adderley, Dinah Washington, and Sarah Vaughan recorded for EmArcy.

It is today a European jazz label owned by Universal Music Group. The catalogue is managed by the Island Records subsidiary.

Discography
Mono 12" LP series (1954–c. 1958)

References

External links 
 Official site
 Michael Fitzgerald Jazz Discography; Emarcy 36000 series
 Modern Jazz Discography:  Emarcy Records discographies (via Mercury page)
EmArcy Records on the Internet Archive's Great 78 Project

Record labels established in 1954
British record labels
Jazz record labels
Labels distributed by Universal Music Group
Verve Records labels